Katja Aili Maria Toivola (born October 27, 1975) is a Finnish trombonist. She is the first female wind instrument player to play regularly at Preservation Hall in New Orleans. She also plays the bass drum and works as a graphic designer and photographer.

Early life
Toivola grew up in Helsinki and attended the Lycée franco-finlandais d'Helsinki, and graduated from its high school in 1994. After that she studied Romance philology and ethnomusicology at the University of Helsinki. She wrote her master's thesis on the ReBirth Brass Band of New Orleans and received a grant for a field trip from the Finnish Cultural Foundation in 2003. The title of the thesis was Feel Like Funkin' It Up – A Study on the New Orleans Jazz Band called ReBirth Brass Band. Toivola graduated from the university in 2005.

Toivola played the piano from the age four on, but she never was excited about that instrument or the material she had to play. "To the disappointment of my teacher, I could never get excited about the theory behind the piano playing, but the music itself had the effect on me that with guts I learned the pieces by heart, slowly but surely."
Toivola discovered jazz in the early 1990s, when he mother took her to a jazz festival.

After this, she would listen to jazz music, but she did not play it. For some time she had an alto saxophone, but she was not destined to play it for long:

Career as a musician
Even at a young age, Toivola knew some musicians and was able to join a band in Helsinki. Then she met some musicians from New Orleans, visiting Helsinki, and they encouraged her to visit their city. When she got there, she went around with her trombone and was given a chance to jam and to get to know the music circles there.

Toivola visited New Orleans for the first time in 1995, and she has lived there since 2004. She found her husband, trumpet player Leroy Jones there, and they have been a couple since 1997 and married since 2016.

In the early days Toivola and Jones experienced a setback, when hurricane Katrina hit the city. The damage that ensued was caused not so much by the hurricane itself but by the fact that the levees built to protect the city failed one after another. Water rose in the flat Toivola and Jones had rented to about four feet, which meant that almost all of their possessions were destroyed. However, the place was cleaned up, and the things that were ruined were thrown away. Luckily the music scene quickly picked up, and they started to get invitation to play gigs. Musicians were the first people to return to the city after the hurricane. Toivola appeared in the American television drama series Treme, during its second season in episode eight entitled "Can I Change My Mind?" She has performed at the Preservation Hall in her husband's band. She returns to Finland a couple of times a year, and then she plays in the bands Spirit of New Orleans (SONO) and New Orleans Helsinki Connection. SONO has played abroad Fiji and New Zealand, as well jazz festivals in Europe and Scandinavia. New Orleans Helsinki Connection has played twice on New Orleans's JazzFest.

Research
"New Orleansin brass band -musiikin suosion kasvu 1960-luvulta tähän päivään." ('The growth of the popularity of New Orleans brass band music from the 1960s to the present.') Seminar paper in ethnomusicology. (In Finnish.)
"Rebirth Brass Bandin Do whatcha wanna -kappaleen rakenneanalyysi." 2002. ('A structural analysis of the song Do whatcha wanna by Rebirth Brass Band.') Seminar paper in ethnomusicology. (In Finnish.)
Feel like funkin' it up: tutkielma New Orleansin jazzia soittavasta Rebirth Brass Bandistä. 2003. ('Feel like funkin' it up: A Study on the New Orleansin Jazz Band Rebirth Brass Band'.) (In Finnish.) A master's thesis in ethonomusicology.) Pdf version the e-thesis –service of Helsinki University

Discography
With Spirit of New Orleans
 2002  Bogalusa Strut
 2006  Some of These Days
 2009  Mahogany Hall Stomp

With New Orleans Helsinki Connection
 2004  At Last
 2012  Paradise On Earth

As guest
 2005  Leroy Jones, Memories of the Fairview & Hurricane Band
 2012  Leroy Jones, Go to the Mardi Gras
 2004  Susanna Mesiä, Susanna Mesiä trad
 2012  Original Hurricane Brass Band, We Shall Not Be Moved
 1997  Riverside Rascals, Riverside Rascals featuring Tricia Boutté

External links
Home page
Article on the YLE television program Pasuunarakkautta "Trombone love"

References

1975 births
Living people
Musicians from Helsinki
Finnish jazz trombonists
Finnish expatriates in the United States
People from New Orleans
21st-century trombonists